Christian Stützinger (born 6 July 1969) is a German sports shooter. He competed in the men's 50 metre running target event at the 1988 Summer Olympics.

References

External links
 

1969 births
Living people
German male sport shooters
Olympic shooters of West Germany
Shooters at the 1988 Summer Olympics
People from Kronach (district)
Sportspeople from Upper Franconia